Berdyash Russky (Urıś Birźäşe) is a rural locality (a selo) in Ivano-Kuvalatsky Selsoviet, Zilairsky District, Bashkortostan, Russia. The population was 13 as of 2010. There is 1 street.

Geography 
Berdyash Russky is located 46 km north of Zilair (the district's administrative centre) by road. Krasny Kushak is the nearest rural locality.

References 

Rural localities in Zilairsky District